Frontenac House is an independent publishing house located in Calgary, Alberta, Canada. Founded in 2000 by Rose and David Scollard,  50 titles in print are from this literary press.

Poetry
Frontenac’s initial area of interest was poetry, which began with the "Quartet 2001 of four poetry books."   Each year since then the company has published a set of four Quartet poetry titles. The house has been recognized for its contribution to Alberta publishing, winning Alberta Publisher of the Year in 2006, and also for its role as an important Canadian poetry publisher. In 2010, to celebrate the 10th anniversary of the series, Frontenac will be publishing a group of 10 books, which will be named, appropriately, Dektet 2010. Manuscripts, which were solicited from across Canada, were evaluated by an arm's-length jury of three outstanding Canadian poets (bill bissett, George Elliott Clarke, and Alice Major).

Diversity
Frontenac has deliberately pursued diversity among its writers in subject matter, writing technique, gender orientation, and social and political attitudes. Geographically, the company has published a relatively high number of Alberta-based poets, but has also produced books by writers living in British Columbia, Saskatchewan, Ontario, and as far afield as San Francisco and Paris. Attention is given to developing new and previously unpublished writers, although writers who had already received high levels of recognition for their work have also been included on the list.

Titles 
In recent years, Frontenac House has expanded their mandate beyond poetry to publish art books, aviation history, and political satire. Some of the titles published by Frontenac House include:
 And God Created Manyberries by Ron Wood, which was shortlisted for the Howard O’Hagan Award for Short Fiction and the Stephen Leacock Memorial Medal in 2008.
 Maverick in the Sky by Shirlee Smith Matheson, a biography of flying ace Freddie McCall, who is also commemorated in the Mavericks exhibit at the Glenbow Museum.
 Breathing Stone by Carol Sheehan on the argylite sculpture of the Queen Charlotte Islands which was shortlisted for the Alberta Book Award
 Contrary Infatuations, Dymphny Dronyk which was shortlisted for the 2008 Gerald Lampert Award and the Stephan G. Stephansson Award for Poetry.

Authors 

Frontenac has published authors including Leslie Greentree, Shirlee Smith Matheson, Micheline Maylor, Billy-Ray Belcourt, and founder of the Calgary International Spoken Word Festival, Sheri-D Wilson.

Executive 
The principals of Frontenac House are Rose Scollard, whose publishing background includes roles as editor at Ryerson Press and McClelland & Stewart West; and David Scollard, who was a sales rep and editor at Ryerson, Managing Editor at McClelland & Stewart, and Editorial Director at McClelland & Stewart West and Neil Petrunia.  All Frontenac books are designed by Neil Petrunia, who is an instructor of design technology at Alberta College of Art and Design, as well as being the principal at Epix Design Inc.

References

External links 
 Frontenac House website

Book publishing companies of Canada
Small press publishing companies
Publishing companies established in 2000
Companies based in Calgary